Johan Brunström and Dick Norman were the defending champions, but only Brunström chose to defend his title, partnering Andreas Siljeström.

Brunström and Siljeström won the title, defeating Flavio Cipolla and Rogério Dutra Silva 0–6, 6–4, [10–8] in the final.

Seeds

Draw

References
 Main Draw

Open Citta' Della Disfida - Doubles
2016 Doubles